Advance Party may refer to:
Advance party, a group sent ahead of a military force to perform reconnaissance
Advance Party (film series), a projected trilogy of films that are Scottish/Danish co-productions, of which the first is Red Road
Advance Party (religious movement), a one part of Brahma Kumaris spiritual family
The Chief Scouts' Advance Party Report, a 1966 publication proposing reform of the Boy Scouts' Association in the United Kingdom